Francisco de Castro Gonçalves (born 27 January 1941) is a Brazilian former footballer who competed in the 1960 Summer Olympics.

References

1941 births
Living people
Association football forwards
Brazilian footballers
Olympic footballers of Brazil
Footballers at the 1960 Summer Olympics